Chess at the 2005 Southeast Asian Games took place at the Tagaytay City Convention Center in Tagaytay, Cavite, Philippines.

Chess is not one of the Olympic Games events but is included in the Southeast Asian Games.

Summary

Medalists

Men

Women

External links
Southeast Asian Games Official results

2005 Southeast Asian Games events
2005
Southeast Asian Games
Southeast Asian Games 2005